Thorstein Arthur Johansen (7 January 1888 – 2 August 1963) was a Norwegian rifle shooter who competed in the early 20th century.

He participated in shooting at the 1920 Summer Olympics in Antwerp and won the gold medal in team 100 m running deer, double shots. He was also a member of the Norwegian trap team which finished seventh in the team clay pigeons event.

References

External links
profile

1888 births
1963 deaths
Norwegian male sport shooters
ISSF rifle shooters
Olympic shooters of Norway
Shooters at the 1920 Summer Olympics
Olympic gold medalists for Norway
Trap and double trap shooters
Olympic medalists in shooting
Medalists at the 1920 Summer Olympics
Sportspeople from Oslo
20th-century Norwegian people